John Helt (born 29 December 1959) is a Danish former football (soccer) player in the midfielder position.

Club career
He made his first team debut in 1978 with Lyngby Boldklub, with whom he won the 1983 Danish championship and 1984 Danish Cup trophies. He moved to play for league rivals Brøndby IF where he won the 1985 Danish championship. Back in Lyngby, he helped the club win the 1990 Danish Cup. He ended his career at Lyngby in November 1991, having played 378 matches and scored ten goals for the club.

International career
Helt played 39 matches for the Denmark national football team from 1982 to 1990, and represented Denmark at the 1988 European Championship.

External links
Danish national team profile

1959 births
Living people
Danish men's footballers
Denmark international footballers
Denmark under-21 international footballers
UEFA Euro 1988 players
Danish expatriate men's footballers
Brøndby IF players
FC Sochaux-Montbéliard players
Ligue 1 players
Expatriate footballers in France
Association football midfielders
People from Lyngby-Taarbæk Municipality
Sportspeople from the Capital Region of Denmark